Qalaouiyeh    is a village in the  Bint Jbeil District in southern Lebanon.

Name
According to E. H. Palmer, the name  Kalawei comes from  the ancient Kelabo.

History
In 1881, the PEF's Survey of Western Palestine (SWP)  described Burj Alawei as: “A village, built of stone, on high ground, containing 150 Metawileh, surrounded by olives, fig-trees, and arable land. The water supply is from cisterns only."  They further noted: "Ancient remains and some lintels."

References

Bibliography

External links
 Qalaouiyeh, Localiban 
Survey of Western Palestine, Map 2:   IAA, Wikimedia commons
 

Populated places in the Israeli security zone 1985–2000
Populated places in Bint Jbeil District
Shia Muslim communities in Lebanon